Protein FRG1 is an actin-bundling protein that in humans is encoded by the FRG1 gene.

This gene maps to a location 100 kb centromeric of the repeat units on chromosome 4q35 which are deleted in facioscapulohumeral muscular dystrophy (FSHD). It is evolutionarily conserved and has related sequences on multiple human chromosomes but DNA sequence analysis did not reveal any homology to known genes. In vivo studies demonstrate the encoded protein is localized to the nucleolus. Mice that overexpress FRG1 display facioscapulohumeral muscular dystrophy. Gabellili et al. suggest that human facioscapulohumeral muscular dystrophy results from overexpression of FRG1 in "skeletal muscle, which leads to abnormal alternative splicing of specific pre-mRNAs." This result has been replicated in tadpoles.

References

Further reading